, abbreviated as JAFCO is a investment holding company headquartered in the Toranomon district of Minato-ku, Tokyo, Japan. It is listed on the First Section of the Tokyo Stock Exchange. JAFCO is considered to be the oldest as well as largest Venture Capital company in Japan.

History 

In April 1973, JAFCO under the name, Japan Associated Finance Co., Ltd. was established in Chuo, Tokyo with capital of ¥500 million. It was created by multiple Japanese financial institutions including Nomura Securities, Nippon Life Insurance and Sanwa Bank. Nomura was the largest shareholder.

In April 1982, JAFCO established Japan's first venture capital partnership fund.

In April 1984, JAFCO America Ventures Inc. was established in San Francisco.

In February 1996, JAFCO moved its head office to Chiyoda,Tokyo.

In August 1997, the company was renamed to JAFCO Co., Ltd.

In May 1998, JAFCO established its buyout investment unit.

In January 2001, JAFCO held an initial public offering to list its shares on the First Section of the Tokyo Stock Exchange.

In 2003, JAFCO America Ventures Inc., was spun off to become Globespan Capital Partners, as part of a management buyout. In the same year a second American subsidiary was established called Jafco Ventures (now renamed to Icon Ventures).

In July 2017, Nomura sold all its shares of its stake in JAFCO.

In October 2020, the company was renamed to JAFCO Group Co., Ltd.

Business overview 
JAFCO raises capital from investors and allocates it to its funds. The funds make equity investments in selected startups and unlisted companies to provide growth capital. JAFCO also provides management services, loans and consultation services to the invested companies. The objective is to increase enterprise value of its portfolio companies and to lead them to exits through various means such as IPO, M&A. JAFCO will receive capital gains as a result of the successful exits.

As of 31 March 2020, the majority of JAFCO's investments are venture capital investments made in Japan (55.2%). Other investments include buyout investments in Japan (16.4%) and venture capital investments made in US (24.2%) and Asia ex-Japan (4.2%).

JAFCO is headquartered in the Toranomon district of Minato-ku, Tokyo, Japan with other regional branches in Chubu, Kansai and Kyushu.

Notable investments include Shintom, Nippon Cable, Cyberdyne and UUUM.

Subsidiaries

JAFCO Asia 
JAFCO Asia is a wholly owned subsidiary of JAFCO that operates in Asia (excluding Japan) with a focus on technology companies. 

In 1990, JAFCO and Nomura established a joint-venture subsidiary in Singapore named Nomura/JAFCO Investment (Asia) Ltd. In 1999, JAFCO acquired full control of the subsidiary where it was renamed to JAFCO Investment (Asia Pacific).

It is headquartered in Singapore with additional offices in Beijing, Shanghai and Taipei. JAFCO Asia also had an office in South Korea which spun off to become BridgePole Investment Co., Ltd., as part of a management buyout in 2019.

Notable investments include Tudou, Teabox, Bubbly, ChinaCache, Mistral Solutions, CustomerXPs and HiSoft.

Icon Ventures 
Icon Ventures is a wholly owned subsidiary of JAFCO that operates in the United States.

in 2003, Jafco Ventures was founded by Joe Horowitz in 2003 in Palo Alto, California. JAFCO would provide capital for its funds. In 2015, Jafco Ventures was rebranded as Icon Ventures in order to strengthen its brand name in the US.

Icon Ventures has historically funded early stage, and growth stage investments in private technology-based businesses. Significant technology companies that it has backed include Bill.com, Teladoc, FireEye, Palo Alto Networks, and Proofpoint.

References

External links
 Official Website
JAFCO Asia
Icon Ventures

Companies listed on the Tokyo Stock Exchange
Financial services companies based in Tokyo
Holding companies based in Tokyo
Private equity firms of Asia-Pacific
Venture capital firms of Japan